Chitrali most often refers to:
 Khowar language, a Dardic language of Chitral, Pakistan

Chitral(i) language(s) may also refer to:
 any of the languages of Chitral
 a subgroup of the Dardic languages, comprising Khowar and Kalasha

See also 
 Chitrali (disambiguation)